The J. F. Watkins House, located in Portland, Oregon, is a house that is listed on the National Register of Historic Places.

See also
 National Register of Historic Places listings in Washington County, Oregon

References

Houses in Washington County, Oregon
Houses on the National Register of Historic Places in Oregon
National Register of Historic Places in Washington County, Oregon